Communicating artery may refer to:

Anterior communicating artery (arteria communicans anterior)
Posterior communicating artery (arteria communicans posterior)